The 2008–09 Football League Trophy, known as the 2008–09 Johnstone's Paint Trophy for sponsorship reasons, is the 25th Football League Trophy, a knockout competition for English football clubs in Leagues One and Two, the third and fourth tiers of English football. Luton Town won the competition, beating Scunthorpe United 3–2 after extra time in the final. However, Luton were unable to defend their trophy as they were relegated from the Football League at the end of the season.

The format was the same as that which had been used since 1996, with four first round regions; North-West, North-East, South-West and South-East and a two-region format from the second round; North and South. The resulting regional winners then meet in the final.

First round
The First Round draw was conducted on 16 August 2008. The teams to be granted byes to the Second Round were drawn first, with the remaining teams drawn for the First Round ties. The First Round matches were played in the week commencing 1 September 2008.

Northern Section

Southern Section

First round byes

Northern section
Bury, Carlisle United, Chester City,  Darlington, Lincoln City, Rochdale, Rotherham United, Huddersfield Town.

Southern section
Cheltenham Town, Gillingham, Hereford United, Luton Town, Milton Keynes Dons, Peterborough United, Walsall, Wycombe Wanderers.

Second round
The Second Round draw was conducted on 6 September 2008, with matches played in the week commencing 6 October 2008.

Northern Section

Southern Section

Area quarter-finals
The draw for the area quarter-finals was conducted on 11 October 2008. The matches were played in the week commencing 3 November 2008, with the exception of the match between Brighton & Hove Albion and Swindon Town, which was played on 12 November 2008.

Northern Section

Southern Section

Area semi-finals
The draw for the area semi-finals was conducted on 8 November 2008, and matches were played in the week commencing 15 December 2008.

Northern Section

Southern Section

Area finals
The area finals, which serve as the semi-finals for the entire competition, are contested over two legs, home and away. The first legs were played on 20 January 2009; the second legs were played on 17 February 2009.

Northern Section

Scunthorpe United won 3–0 on aggregate.

Southern Section

Brighton & Hove Albion 1–1 Luton Town on aggregate. Luton Town won 4–3 on penalties.

Final

External links
 Tournament home page

EFL Trophy
Trophy
Trophy